Purnendu Narayan Khan (born 21 April 1911, date of death unknown) was an Indian politician. He was elected to the Lok Sabha, the lower house of the Parliament of India from the Uluberia in West Bengal as a member of the Indian National Congress.

References

External links
Official biographical sketch in Parliament of India website

Indian National Congress politicians
India MPs 1962–1967
Lok Sabha members from West Bengal
People from Howrah district
1911 births
Year of death missing